Freedom in the World is a yearly survey and report by the U.S.-based non-governmental organization Freedom House that measures the degree of civil liberties and political rights in every nation and significant related and disputed territories around the world.

Sub-Saharan Africa 
Key: * - Electoral democracies (as described above), PR - Political Rights, CL - Civil Liberties, Free Status: Free, Partly Free, Not Free

Americas 
Key: * - Electoral democracies (as described above), PR - Political Rights, CL - Civil Liberties, Free Status: Free, Partly Free, Not Free

Asia-Pacific 
Key: * - Electoral democracies (as described above), PR - Political Rights, CL - Civil Liberties, Free Status: Free, Partly Free, Not Free

Eurasia 
Key: * - Electoral democracies (as described above), PR - Political Rights, CL - Civil Liberties, Free Status: Free, Partly Free, Not Free

Europe 
Key: * - Electoral democracies (as described above), PR - Political Rights, CL - Civil Liberties, Free Status: Free, Partly Free, Not Free

Middle East and North Africa 
Note: The Middle East countries of Turkey, Cyprus, Georgia, Azerbaijan and Armenia can be found in the "Europe" and "Eurasia" sections of Freedom House's Freedom in the World report.

Key: * - Electoral democracies (as described above), PR - Political Rights, CL - Civil Liberties, Free Status: Free, Partly Free, Not Free

See also
 Freedom in the World
 Democracy Ranking
 Democracy-Dictatorship Index
 List of indices of freedom
 Index of Freedom in the World
 Freedom of the Press report
 Polity data series
 Democracy in the Middle East

Notes

References
 
 
 
 
  Individuals can download the complete  report (pdf format) for private use.

External links
 Freedom in the World 2018 - online at Freedom House
 Freedom in the World 2017 - online at Freedom House
 Freedom in the World 2016 - online at Freedom House
 Freedom in the World 2015 - online at Freedom House
 Freedom in the World 2014 - online at Freedom House
 Freedom in the World 2013 - online at Freedom House

Human rights
International rankings

no:Freedom in the World
tr:Freedom House Dünya Özgürlük Raporu
vi:Tự do chính trị